Ayatollah of Rock 'n' Rolla is a 2014 single released by Soulfly. The song was first released on the album Savages in 2013. The song's title was inspired by a quote from the film Mad Max 2.

The song features Neil Fallon of Clutch, providing clean vocals in addition to roars by Max Cavalera. The song contains elements of Southern metal in the Pantera style.

Fallon has thoughts about himself and Cavalera singing together, "I am stoked to have been asked by Max to participate on the 'Ayatollah of Rock 'N' Rolla' track! Max brought Clutch out on some of our earliest and most formative tours and this brought back some very fond memories of singing with Max all those years ago." Cavalera quoted about his likeness to Ghost Cult magazine, "A song like 'Ayatollah of Rock 'N' Rolla,' it was something totally new. I never did anything like that before. It starts with like this country, cowboy riff, and Neil starts talking over it and it was so killer! And of course that line in the chorus 'Ayatollah of Rock 'N' Rolla' is from Mad Max. It's probably my favorite song on the album. I don't want to make the same record over and over." Cavalera commented to Songfacts about why he wanted Neil Fallon to join him, "I thought it was a great idea to do a song with Clutch, and mixing Soulfly and Clutch together in the same song for me sounded just so amazing and unusual and wild and exotic, which was great. We did it and it sounds killer."

Personnel 

Band members
 Max Cavalera – vocals, rhythm guitar
 Marc Rizzo – lead guitar
 Tony Campos – bass
 Zyon Cavalera – drums, percussion

Guest
 Neil Fallon – co-vocals
Other staff
 Terry Date – production, engineering, mixing
 Sam Hofstedt – assistant engineering
 Ted Jensen – mastering
 Max Cavalera – writing

References

External links 
 Lyrics

Soulfly songs
2014 singles
2013 songs
Songs written by Max Cavalera
Nuclear Blast Records singles